Baba Aparajith (born 8 July 1994) is an Indian cricketer who plays as an all-rounder. He is a right-handed batsman and off break bowler, who plays first-class cricket for Tamil Nadu. He played for the India Under-19 cricket team in the 2012 Under-19 World Cup. He was a member of the Chennai Super Kings squad in the Indian Premier League for five seasons but had not been picked to play a single match in Indian Premier League.

On 4 October 2013 he scored his first double century playing for South Zone against West Zone in the Duleep Trophy.

He was the leading run-scorer for Tamil Nadu in the 2017–18 Ranji Trophy, with 417 runs in four matches. In July 2018, he was named in the squad for India Red for the 2018–19 Duleep Trophy. In October 2019, he was named in India B's squad for the 2019–20 Deodhar Trophy.

References

External links 
 Baba Aparajith's profile page on Wisden

Indian cricketers
Tamil Nadu cricketers
South Zone cricketers
Chennai Super Kings cricketers
Living people
1994 births
Rising Pune Supergiant cricketers
India Blue cricketers
India Red cricketers
Cricketers from Chennai
Rupganj Tigers Cricket Club cricketers